The 2022 New Mexico State Aggies football team represented New Mexico State University in the 2022 NCAA Division I FBS football season. The Aggies played their home games at Aggie Memorial Stadium in Las Cruces, New Mexico, and compete as an FBS independent. They were led by first-year head coach Jerry Kill.

The season was the program's last season as an independent as the Aggies joined Conference USA in 2023.

Despite having a 6–6 regular-season record with two wins over FCS teams, the NCAA granted a waiver for New Mexico State to be bowl-eligible due to their canceled game against San Jose State.

Previous season 
The Aggies finished the 2021 season 2–10. 

Following the final game of the season, the school announced the head coach Doug Martin's contract would not be renewed. On November 27, the school announced that Jerry Kill would be the team's new head coach.

Schedule
New Mexico State's schedule consists of six home games and six away games for the 2022 season.

References

New Mexico State
New Mexico State Aggies football seasons
Quick Lane Bowl champion seasons
New Mexico State Aggies